Marion Exelby (born 6 November 1951) is an Australian fencer. She competed in the women's individual foil event at the 1972 Summer Olympics.

References

1951 births
Living people
Australian female foil fencers
Olympic fencers of Australia
Fencers at the 1972 Summer Olympics
Commonwealth Games medallists in fencing
Commonwealth Games silver medallists for Australia
Fencers at the 1970 British Commonwealth Games
20th-century Australian women
21st-century Australian women
Medallists at the 1970 British Commonwealth Games